Myles Noel Kenyon (25 December 1886 – 21 November 1960) was an English cricketer.

He was born at Walshaw Hall, Bury, Lancashire, the son of James Kenyon, a prosperous woollen manufacturer and Elise (née Genth) Kenyon and educated at Eton School.

He played cricket as a right-handed batsman for Lancashire and was club captain from 1919 to 1922. He was club president in 1936–37. In 1934 he served as High Sheriff of Lancashire. He was also a Deputy Lieutenant for the county.

He died 21 November 1960 in Birdham, Sussex aged 73. In 1909 he had married Mary Moon.

The Myles N. Kenyon Cup is competed for by amateur football teams in the Bury area.

References

1886 births
1960 deaths
Cricketers from Bury, Greater Manchester
English cricketers
High Sheriffs of Lancashire
Lancashire cricket captains
Lancashire cricketers
People educated at Eton College